Ilthpaya Lake is a  lake located on Vancouver Island west of Clayoquot Arm and north of Kennedy River.

See also
List of lakes of British Columbia

References

Alberni Valley
Lakes of Vancouver Island
Clayoquot Land District